Ruben Torres may refer to:

People
 Ruben Torres (Filipino politician) (born 1941), Filipino politician and activist
 Rubén Torres (footballer) (born 1949), Venezuelan footballer
 Rubén Torres (tennis) (born 1981), Colombian tennis player
 Rubén Torres Llorca (born 1957), Cuban artist
 Rubén Alfredo Torres Zavala (born 1968), Mexican politician

Other
 Ruben M. Torres Unit, state prison in Hondo, Texas